The Urannah Dam is a project being built by project proponent Bowen River Utilities, located  west of Mackay in the Mackay Region, Queensland,  Australia. The dam wall will be built across the Broken River at approx .

Alongside the dam will be two pipelines to deliver water to industrial customers, a master planned irrigation scheme and a pumped hydro which will feed reliable energy back into the grid.
 
The dam has  been opposed by conservationists, including concerns that the dam would impact the Irwin's turtle.

Dam proposal 
The Urannah Dam is a A$2.9 billion project, proposed as a 1.5 million megalitre dam that includes a water pipeline network, an irrigated precinct, and pumped hyro-electricity storage and power generation infrastructure. The dam would provide water to mining in the region, as well as agriculture. The project proponent is the Bowen River Utilities, previously the Urannah Water Scheme.

According to the latest preliminary business case, over a third of water from proposed dam would be for current and expanded coal mining in the Bowen Basin. Supporting regional mining expansion is first and foremost of the opportunities listed for the water allocation in the report. The supplementary "Water Demand Study" states that within the region there are 30 active coal mines, and 57 proposed coal mining projects, and that there is a major shortfall of water needed to supply the Bowen Basin coal industry.

Urannah Dam has also been linked to expansion of coal mining in the Galilee Basin.

The dam was first proposed in the 1960s. Since then, there have been over 25 feasibility studies into the dam, but the project had not proceeded beyond that stage.

A report prepared on behalf of the Mackay Conservation Group assessing the cost benefits of the dam project found that for every dollar spent on the dam, only 75 cents would be returned.

In December 2019, the government gave $10 million in funding for a business case and environmental impact statement to be developed. This is expected to be completed by late 2021. In May 2020, the project was declared a coordinated project by Queensland's Coordinator-General. The construction date is listed as 2022.

in 2016, there was also federal funding of $3 million given for a feasibility study for the project. There were concerns raised about the allocation of this funding despite Urannah Dam not being on a list of priority projects sent to the then Deputy Prime Minister Barnaby Joyce. Major concerns over conflict of interest were also raised, as the funding was awarded to the company Initiative Capital, which was run by an LNP member and party donor.

Cultural significance 
Urannah is part of the homelands of the Wiri and Birri peoples of the Birri Gubba Nation. Urannah contains Aboriginal sacred sites, including burial sites and ceremonial sites, who have said:

Environmental significance 
Urannah valley is a pristine and undisturbed ecosystem, home to many terrestrial and aquatic species.

Urannah contains a diversity of terrestrial habitats, including steep mountains and forested valleys, and over 20 plant species have been recorded at Urannah. Forest ecosystems at Urannah includes the endangered bluegum forests, as well as ironbark and black iron box forest. Urannah is also a rare example of pre-European native grasslands.

Urannah is home to the IUCN-listed "near threatened" species black-necked stork (Jaiburu), and the "vulnerable" grey falcon. Thirty species of birds have been identified at Urannah, including kookaburras, cockatoos, eagles, honey-eaters, owls, kingfishers and pelicans.

Urannah is home to koalas, bettong, and several species of kangaroo, including the tree kangaroo, the grey kangaroo, and the pretty-face wallaby.

Flowing through Urannah are Urannah Creek and the Broken River, which is part of the Burdekin river system. These rivers are home to Urannah's most iconic animal, Irwin's turtle, Elysea irwini., which was discovered by Steve and Bob Irwin. The turtle is endemic to the Broken-Bowen River system and the lower Burdekin River, and is of high conservation significance, with a restricted range that places the species at risk of decline. According to the Threatened Species Scientific Committee, the proposed development of Urannah Dam would have a significant negative impact on Irwin's turtle.

The endangered Eungella day frog has been found at Urannah. Five species of fish have been found in Urannah's rivers, including rainbow fish, 5-barred grunter, spangled perch, sooty grunter and blue catfish. Crocodiles and platypus are also known to live in the rivers a and creeks of Urannah.

References 

Dams in Queensland